This is a list of fells, hills, mountains, groups of mountains and subsidiary summits and tops in the Lake District, England.

Alphabetical list

A 
Allen Crags
Angletarn Pikes
Ard Crags
Armboth Fell
Arnison Crag
Arthur's Pike

B 
Bakestall
Bannerdale Crags
Barf
Barrow
Base Brown
Beda Fell
Binsey
Birker Fell
Birkhouse Moor
Birks
Black Combe
Black Fell
Blake Fell
Blea Rigg
Bleaberry Fell
Blencathra
Bonscale Pike
Bowfell
Bowscale Fell
Brae Fell
Brandreth
Branstree
Brim Fell
Brock Crags
Broom Fell
Brown Pike
Buckbarrow
Buck Pike
Burnbank Fell

C 
Calf Crag
Carl Side
Carrock Fell
Castle Crag
Catbells
Catstycam
Caudale Moor
Causey Pike
Caw Fell
Clough Head
Cold Pike
Coniston Old Man
Crag Fell
Crinkle Crags

D 
Dale Head
Dent
Dodd
Dollywaggon Pike
Dove Crag
Dow Crag

E 
Eagle Crag
Eel Crag (Crag Hill)
Esk Pike

F 
Fairfield
Fellbarrow
Firbank Fell
Fleetwith Pike
Froswick

G 
Gavel Fell
Gibson Knott
Glaramara
Glenridding Dodd
Gowbarrow Fell
Grange Fell
Grasmoor
Gray Crag
Grayrigg Forest
Graystones
Great Borne
Great Calva
Great Carrs
Great Cockup
Great Crag
Great Dodd
Great End
Great Gable
Great Mell Fell
Great Rigg
Great Sca Fell
Green Crag
Green Gable
Grey Crag
Grey Friar
Grey Knotts
Grike
Grisedale Pike
Gummer's How

H 
Hallin Fell
Hard Knott
Harrison Stickle
Hart Crag
Hart Side
Harter Fell, Eskdale
Harter Fell, Mardale
Hartsop above How
Hartsop Dodd
Haycock
Haystacks
Helm Crag
Helvellyn
Hen Comb
Heron Pike
High Crag
High Hartsop Dodd
High Pike (Scandale)
High Pike (Caldbeck)
High Raise
High Raise
High Rigg
High Seat
High Spy
High Stile
High Street
High Tove
Hindscarth
Holme Fell
Hopegill Head

I 
Ill Bell
Illgill Head

K 
Kentmere Pike
Kidsty Pike
Kirk Fell
Knott
Knott Rigg
Knott, The

L 
Lank Rigg
Latrigg
Ling Fell
Lingmell
Lingmoor Fell
Little Hart Crag
Little Mell Fell
Loadpot Hill
Loft Crag
Long Side
Longlands Fell
Lonscale Fell
Lord's Seat
Loughrigg Fell
Low Fell
Low Pike
Lowthwaite Fell

M 
Maiden Moor
Mardale Ill Bell
Meal Fell
Mellbreak
Middle Dodd
Middle Fell
Muncaster Fell
Mungrisdale Common

N 
Nab Scar
The Nab
Nethermost Pike

O 
Outerside

P 
Pavey Ark
Pike of Blisco
Pike of Stickle
Pillar
Place Fell

R 
Raise
Rampsgill Head
Rannerdale Knotts
Raven Crag
Red Pike (Buttermere)
Red Pike (Wasdale)
Red Screes
Rest Dodd
Robinson
Rossett Pike
Rosthwaite Fell

S 
Sail
Saint Sunday Crag
Sale Fell
Sallows
Sca Fell
Scafell Pike
Scar Crags
Scoat Fell
Seat Sandal
Seatallan
Seathwaite Fell
Selside Pike
Sergeant Man
Sergeant's Crag
Sheffield Pike
Shipman Knotts
Silver How
Skiddaw
Skiddaw Little Man
Slate Fell
Slight Side
Sour Howes
Souther Fell
Starling Dodd
Steel Fell
Steel Knotts
Steeple
Stone Arthur
Stybarrow Dodd
Swirl How

T 
Tarn Crag (Easedale)
Tarn Crag (Far Eastern Fells)
Thornthwaite Crag
Thunacar Knott
Top o'Selside
Troutbeck Tongue

U 
Ullock Pike
Ullscarf

W 
Walla Crag
Wandope
Wansfell
Watch Hill
Watson's Dodd
Wether Hill
Wetherlam
Whin Rigg
Whinlatter
White Side
Whitfell
Whiteless Pike
Whiteside

Y 
Yoke
Yewbarrow

By height

Wainwrights 

These are the 214 fells selected by Alfred Wainwright for a chapter in his seven Pictorial Guides to the Lakeland Fells. See List of Wainwrights for them sorted by book, and the other Lake District fells he listed in The Outlying Fells of Lakeland.

Scafell Pike, 978 m (3209 ft) 
Scafell, 964 m (3163 ft)
Helvellyn, 950 m (3117 ft)
Skiddaw, 931 m (3054 ft)
Great End, 910 m (2986 ft)
Bowfell, 902 m (2959 ft)
Great Gable, 899 m (2949 ft)
Pillar, 892 m (2927 ft)
Nethermost Pike, 891 m (2923 ft)
Catstye Cam, 890 m (2920 ft)
Esk Pike, 885 m (2904 ft)
Raise, 883 m (2897 ft)
Fairfield, 873 m (2864 ft)
Blencathra, 868 m (2848 ft)
Skiddaw Little Man, 865 m (2838 ft)
White Side, 863 m (2831 ft)
Crinkle Crags, 859 m (2818 ft)
Dollywaggon Pike, 858 m (2815 ft)
Great Dodd, 857 m (2812 ft)
Grasmoor, 852 m (2795 ft)
Stybarrow Dodd, 843 m (2766 ft)
St Sunday Crag, 841 m (2759 ft)
Scoat Fell, 841 m (2759 ft)
Crag Hill, 839 m (2753 ft)
High Street, 828 m (2717 ft)
Red Pike (Wasdale), 826 m (2710 ft)
Hart Crag, 822 m (2697 ft)
Steeple, 819 m (2687 ft)
High Stile, 807 m (2648 ft)
Lingmell, 807 m (2648 ft)
Old Man of Coniston, 803 m (2635 ft)
High Raise (High Street), 802 m (2631 ft)
Kirk Fell, 802 m (2631 ft)
Swirl How, 802 m (2631 ft)
Green Gable, 801 m (2628 ft)
Haycock, 797 m (2615 ft)
Brim Fell, 796 m (2612 ft)
Dove Crag, 792 m (2598 ft)
Rampsgill Head, 792 m (2598 ft)
Grisedale Pike, 791 m (2595 ft)
Watson's Dodd, 789 m (2589 ft)
Allen Crags, 785 m (2575 ft)
Great Carrs, 785 m (2575 ft)
Thornthwaite Crag, 784 m (2572 ft)
Glaramara, 783 m (2569 ft)
Kidsty Pike, 780 m (2559 ft)
Harter Fell, Mardale, 778 m (2552 ft)
Dow Crag, 778 m (2552 ft)
Red Screes, 776 m (2546 ft)
Sail, 773 m (2536 ft)
Grey Friar, 773 m (2536 ft)
Wandope, 772 m (2533 ft)
Hopegill Head, 770 m (2526 ft)
Great Rigg, 766 m (2513 ft)
Wetherlam, 763 m (2503 ft)
Stony Cove Pike, 763 m (2503 ft)
Slight Side, 762 m (2500 ft)
High Raise, Langdale, 762 m (2500 ft)
Mardale Ill Bell, 760 m (2493 ft)
Ill Bell, 757 m (2484 ft)
Hart Side, 756 m (2480 ft)
Red Pike (Buttermere), 755 m (2477 ft)
Dale Head, 753 m (2470 ft)
Carl Side, 746 m (2448 ft)
High Crag, 744 m (2441 ft)
The Knott, 739 m (2425 ft)
Robinson, 737 m (2418 ft)
Seat Sandal, 736 m (2415 ft)
Harrison Stickle, 736 m (2415 ft)
Sergeant Man, 736 m (2415 ft)
Long Side, 734 m (2408 ft)
Kentmere Pike, 730 m (2395 ft)
Hindscarth, 727 m (2385 ft)
Clough Head, 726 m (2382 ft)
Ullscarf, 726 m (2382 ft)
Thunacar Knott, 723 m (2372 ft)
Froswick, 720 m (2362 ft)
Birkhouse Moor, 718 m (2356 ft)
Brandreth, 715 m (2346 ft)
Lonscale Fell, 715 m (2346 ft)
Branstree, 713 m (2339 ft)
Knott, 710 m (2329 ft)
Pike of Stickle, 709 m (2326 ft)
Whiteside, 707 m (2320 ft)
Yoke, 706 m (2316 ft)
Pike of Blisco, 705 m (2313 ft)
Bowscale Fell, 702 m (2303 ft)
Cold Pike, 701 m (2300 ft)
Pavey Ark, 700 m (2297 ft)
Gray Crag, 699 m (2293 ft)
Grey Knotts, 697 m (2287 ft)
Caw Fell, 697 m (2287 ft)
Rest Dodd, 696 m (2283 ft)
Seatallan, 692 m (2270 ft)
Ullock Pike, 690 m (2264 ft)
Great Calva, 690 m (2264 ft)
Bannerdale Crags, 683 m (2241 ft)
Loft Crag, 680 m (2231 ft)
Sheffield Pike, 675 m (2215 ft)
Bakestall, 673 m (2208 ft)
Scar Crags, 672 m (2205 ft)
Loadpot Hill, 671 m (2201 ft)
Wether Hill, 670 m (2198 ft)
Tarn Crag (Far Eastern Fells), 664 m (2178 ft)
Carrock Fell, 663 m (2175 ft)
Whiteless Pike, 660 m (2165 ft)
High Pike (Caldbeck), 658 m (2159 ft)
Place Fell, 657 m (2156 ft)
High Pike (Scandale), 656 m (2152 ft)
Selside Pike, 655 m (2149 ft)
Harter Fell, Eskdale, 654 m (2146 ft)
Middle Dodd, 654 m (2146 ft)
High Spy, 653 m (2142 ft)
Rossett Pike, 651 m (2136 ft)
Great Sca Fell, 651 m (2136 ft)
Fleetwith Pike, 648 m (2126 ft)
Base Brown, 646 m (2119 ft)
Grey Crag, 638 m (2093 ft)
Causey Pike, 637 m (2090 ft)
Little Hart Crag, 637 m (2090 ft)
Starling Dodd, 633 m (2077 ft)
Mungrisdale Common, 633 m (2077 ft)
Yewbarrow, 627 m (2057 ft)
Birks, 622 m (2041 ft)
Hartsop Dodd, 618 m (2028 ft)
Great Borne, 616 m (2021 ft)
Heron Pike, 612 m (2008 ft)
Illgill Head, 609 m (1998 ft)
High Seat, 608 m (1995 ft)
Seathwaite Fell, 601 m (1972 ft)
Haystacks, 597 m (1959 ft)
Bleaberry Fell, 590 m (1936 ft)
Shipman Knotts, 587 m (1926 ft)
Brae Fell, 586 m (1923 ft)
Middle Fell, 582 m (1909 ft)
Ard Crags, 581 m (1906 ft)
The Nab, 576 m (1890 ft)
Maiden Moor, 575 m (1886 ft)
Blake Fell, 573 m (1880 ft)
Sergeant's Crag, 571 m (1873 ft)
Hartsop above How, 570 m (1870 ft)
Outerside, 568 m (1864 ft)
Angletarn Pikes, 567 m (1860 ft)
Brock Crags, 561 m (1841 ft)
Knott Rigg, 556 m (1824 ft)
Steel Fell, 553 m (1814 ft)
Lord's Seat, 552 m (1811 ft)
Rosthwaite Fell, 551 m (1808 ft)
Meal Fell, 550 m (1804 ft)
Tarn Crag (Easedale), 550 m (1804 ft)
Hard Knott, 549 m (1801 ft)
Lank Rigg, 541 m (1775 ft)
Blea Rigg, 541 m (1775 ft)
Calf Crag, 537 m (1762 ft)
Great Mell Fell, 537 m (1762 ft)
Whin Rigg, 535 m (1755 ft)
Arthur's Pike, 533 m (1749 ft)
Great Cockup, 526 m (1726 ft)
Gavel Fell, 526 m (1726 ft)
Eagle Crag, 525 m (1722 ft)
Bonscale Pike, 524 m (1719 ft)
Souther Fell, 522 m (1713 ft)
Crag Fell, 520 m (1706 ft)
High Hartsop Dodd, 519 m (1703 ft)
Whinlatter, 517 m (1696 ft)
Sallows, 516 m (1693 ft)
High Tove, 515 m (1690 ft)
Mellbreak, 512 m (1680 ft)
Broom Fell, 511 m (1677 ft)
Hen Comb, 509 m (1670 ft)
Beda Fell, 509 m (1670 ft)
Low Pike, 508 m (1667 ft)
Little Mell Fell, 505 m (1657 ft)
Dodd, 502 m (1647 ft)
Stone Arthur, 500 m (1640 ft)
Green Crag, 489 m (1604 ft)
Baystones, 488 m (1601 ft)
Grike, 486 m (1594 ft)
Sour Howes, 483 m (1585 ft)
Longlands Fell, 483 m (1585 ft)
Gowbarrow Fell, 481 m (1578 ft)
Armboth Fell, 479 m (1572 ft)
Burnbank Fell, 475 m (1558 ft)
Lingmoor Fell, 469 m (1539 ft)
Barf, 468 m (1535 ft)
Raven Crag, 461 m (1512 ft)
Barrow, 455 m (1493 ft)
Graystones, 452 m (1483 ft)
Catbells, 451 m (1480 ft)
Nab Scar, 450 m (1476 ft)
Great Crag, 450 m (1476 ft)
Binsey, 447 m (1467 ft)
Glenridding Dodd, 442 m (1450 ft)
Arnison Crag, 433 m (1421 ft)
Steel Knotts, 432 m (1417 ft)
Low Fell, 423 m (1388 ft)
Gibson Knott, 420 m (1378 ft)
Fellbarrow, 416 m (1365 ft)
Grange Fell, 415 m (1362 ft)
Buckbarrow, 405 m (1329 ft)
Helm Crag, 396 m (1299 ft)
Silver How, 395 m (1296 ft)
Hallin Fell, 388 m (1273 ft)
Walla Crag, 376 m (1234 ft)
Ling Fell, 373 m (1224 ft)
Latrigg, 367 m (1204 ft)
Troutbeck Tongue, 364 m (1194 ft)
Sale Fell, 359 m (1178 ft)
High Rigg, 357 m (1171 ft)
Rannerdale Knotts, 355 m (1165 ft)
Loughrigg Fell, 335 m (1099 ft)
Black Fell, 323 m (1060 ft)
Holme Fell, 317 m (1040 ft)
Castle Crag, 298 m (978 ft)

Marilyns 

A Marilyn is a hill which has a relative height of at least 150 metres (approximately 500 feet), regardless of its absolute height above sea level. List of Marilyns in England gives a more detailed listing, including the relative height for each fell.

Scafell Pike, 978 m (3209 ft)
Helvellyn, 950 m (3117 ft)
Skiddaw, 931 m (3054 ft)
Great Gable, 899 m (2949 ft)
Pillar, 892 m (2927 ft)
Fairfield, 873 m (2864 ft)
Blencathra, 868 m (2848 ft)
Grasmoor, 852 m (2795 ft)
St Sunday Crag, 841 m (2759 ft)
High Street, 828 m (2717 ft)
High Stile, 807 m (2648 ft)
Old Man of Coniston, 803 m (2635 ft)
Kirk Fell, 802 m (2631 ft)
Grisedale Pike, 791 m (2595 ft)
Red Screes, 776 m (2546 ft)
Stony Cove Pike, 763 m (2503 ft)
High Raise, 762 m (2500 ft)
Dale Head, 753 m (2470 ft)
Robinson, 737 m (2418 ft)
Seat Sandal, 736 m (2415 ft)
Knott, 710 m (2329 ft)
Pike of Blisco, 705 m (2313 ft)
Seatallan, 692 m (2270 ft)
Tarn Crag (Far Eastern Fells), 664 m (2178 ft)
Place Fell, 657 m (2156 ft)
Harter Fell, Eskdale, 654 m (2146 ft)
Illgill Head, 609 m (1998 ft)
Black Combe, 600 m (1969 ft)
Whitfell, 573 m (1880 ft)
Blake Fell, 573 m (1880 ft)
Lord's Seat, 552 m (1811 ft)
Hard Knott, 549 m (1801 ft)
Great Mell Fell, 537 m (1762 ft)
Mellbreak, 512 m (1680 ft)
Little Mell Fell, 505 m (1657 ft)
Baystones, 488 m (1601 ft)
Lingmoor Fell, 469 m (1539 ft)
Binsey, 447 m (1467 ft)
Low Fell, 423 m (1388 ft)
Hallin Fell, 388 m (1273 ft)
High Rigg, 357 m (1171 ft)
Dent, 352 m (1155 ft)
Loughrigg Fell, 335 m (1099 ft)
Top o'Selside, 335 m (1099 ft)
Kirkby Moor, 334 m (1096 ft)
Gummer's How, 321 m (1053 ft)
Holme Fell, 317 m (1040 ft)
Claife Heights, 270 m (886 ft)
Watch Hill, 254 m (833 ft)
Swinside, 244 m (801 ft)
Muncaster Fell - Hooker Crag, 231 m (758 ft)
Whitbarrow, 215 m (705 ft)

Hewitts 

The Hewitts are hills which have a relative height of at least 30 metres (approximately 100 feet), and are over 2000 feet (approximately 610 metres) above sea level.

Scafell Pike, 978 m (3209 ft)
Scafell, 964 m (3163 ft)
Helvellyn, 950 m (3117 ft)
Ill Crag, 935 m (3068 ft)
Broad Crag, 934 m (3064 ft)
Skiddaw, 931 m (3054 ft)
Great End, 910 m (2986 ft)
Bowfell, 902 m (2959 ft)
Great Gable, 899 m (2949 ft)
Pillar, 892 m (2927 ft)
Catstye Cam, 890 m (2920 ft)
Esk Pike, 885 m (2904 ft)
Raise, 883 m (2897 ft)
Fairfield, 873 m (2864 ft)
Blencathra, 868 m (2848 ft)
Skiddaw Little Man, 865 m (2838 ft)
White Side, 863 m (2831 ft)
Crinkle Crags, 859 m (2818 ft)
Dollywaggon Pike, 858 m (2815 ft)
Great Dodd, 857 m (2812 ft)
Grasmoor, 852 m (2795 ft)
Stybarrow Dodd, 843 m (2766 ft)
Scoat Fell, 841 m (2759 ft)
St Sunday Crag, 841 m (2759 ft)
Crag Hill, 839 m (2753 ft)
Crinkle Crags South Top, 834 m (2736 ft)
Black Crag, 828 m (2717 ft)
High Street, 828 m (2717 ft)
Red Pike (Wasdale), 826 m (2710 ft)
Hart Crag, 822 m (2697 ft)
Shelter Crags, 815 m (2674 ft)
Lingmell, 807 m (2648 ft)
High Stile, 807 m (2648 ft)
Old Man of Coniston, 803 m (2635 ft)
Kirk Fell, 802 m (2631 ft)
High Raise, 802 m (2631 ft)
Swirl How, 802 m (2631 ft)
Green Gable, 801 m (2628 ft)
Haycock, 797 m (2615 ft)
Green Side, 795 m (2608 ft)
Dove Crag, 792 m (2598 ft)
Rampsgill Head, 792 m (2598 ft)
Grisedale Pike, 791 m (2595 ft)
Kirk Fell East Top, 787 m (2582 ft)
Allen Crags, 785 m (2575 ft)
Thornthwaite Crag, 784 m (2572 ft)
Glaramara, 783 m (2569 ft)
Harter Fell, Mardale, 778 m (2552 ft)
Dow Crag, 778 m (2552 ft)
Red Screes, 776 m (2546 ft)
Sail, 773 m (2536 ft)
Grey Friar, 773 m (2536 ft)
Wandope, 772 m (2533 ft)
Hopegill Head, 770 m (2526 ft)
Great Rigg, 766 m (2513 ft)
Stony Cove Pike, 763 m (2503 ft)
Wetherlam, 763 m (2503 ft)
High Raise, 762 m (2500 ft)
Ill Bell, 757 m (2484 ft)
Red Pike (Buttermere), 755 m (2477 ft)
Dale Head, 753 m (2470 ft)
Carl Side, 746 m (2448 ft)
Black Sails, 745 m (2444 ft)
High Crag, 744 m (2441 ft)
Hobcarton Crag, 739 m (2425 ft)
Robinson, 737 m (2418 ft)
Harrison Stickle, 736 m (2415 ft)
Seat Sandal, 736 m (2415 ft)
Long Side, 734 m (2408 ft)
Kentmere Pike, 730 m (2395 ft)
Hindscarth, 727 m (2385 ft)
Ullscarf, 726 m (2382 ft)
Clough Head, 726 m (2382 ft)
Red Beck Top, 721 m (2365 ft)
Froswick, 720 m (2362 ft)
Whiteside East Top, 719 m (2359 ft)
Lonscale Fell, 715 m (2346 ft)
Brandreth, 715 m (2346 ft)
Branstree, 713 m (2339 ft)
Knott, 710 m (2329 ft)
Pike of Stickle, 709 m (2326 ft)
Yoke, 706 m (2316 ft)
Pike of Blisco, 705 m (2313 ft)
Bowscale Fell, 702 m (2303 ft)
Cold Pike, 701 m (2300 ft)
Rest Dodd, 696 m (2283 ft)
Seatallan, 692 m (2270 ft)
Great Calva, 690 m (2264 ft)
Bannerdale Crags, 683 m (2241 ft)
Sheffield Pike, 675 m (2215 ft)
Scar Crags, 672 m (2205 ft)
Loadpot Hill, 671 m (2201 ft)
Tarn Crag (Far Eastern Fells), 664 m (2178 ft)
Carrock Fell, 663 m (2175 ft)
Whiteless Pike, 660 m (2165 ft)
High Pike (Caldbeck), 658 m (2159 ft)
Place Fell, 657 m (2156 ft)
Selside Pike, 655 m (2149 ft)
Harter Fell, Eskdale, 654 m (2146 ft)
High Spy, 653 m (2142 ft)
Rossett Pike, 651 m (2136 ft)
Fleetwith Pike, 648 m (2126 ft)
Base Brown, 646 m (2119 ft)
Iron Crag, 640 m (2100 ft)
Grey Crag, 638 m (2093 ft)
Causey Pike, 637 m (2090 ft)
Little Hart Crag, 637 m (2090 ft)
Starling Dodd, 633 m (2077 ft)
Dovenest Top, 632 m (2073 ft)
Seathwaite Fell, 632 m (2073 ft)
Rough Crag, 628 m (2060 ft)
Yewbarrow, 627 m (2057 ft)
Great Borne, 616 m (2021 ft)
Yewbarrow North Top, 616 m (2021 ft)

Groups of mountains
Furness Fells
Helvellyn range

See also 

 List of Wainwrights
 List of hills in the Lake District

Lake District
Fells